RCTI (Rajawali Citra Televisi Indonesia) is a West Jakarta-based Indonesian free-to-air television network. It is best known for its soap operas, celebrity bulletins, news, and sports programmes. It was first launched in 1989, originally as a local pay television operator that broadcasts mostly foreign programmes, before switching to free-to-air terrestrial network a year later.

History

In October 1987, state broadcaster TVRI lost its monopoly when the government allowed private television networks to begin broadcasting. RCTI was officially inaugurated on the morning of 24 August 1989 by President Suharto as Indonesia's first privately owned commercial television network. Evening programming was launched by Minister of Information Harmoko. RCTI was initially broadcast to Greater Jakarta area as a local pay television channel and gained a nationwide terrestrial license a year later. Prior to 1994, RCTI mostly aired foreign programmes as it cost less compared to self-produced programmes, and to evoke the look and feel of a conventional pay television (which was a new and expensive technology in Indonesia at the time) . From 1989 to 1990, the station's subscription system requires an UHF set-top box, and in some areas, with a satellite dish. During this time, the subscription system was incorrectly branded as a "pay-per-view", despite the fact that it works similarly as a conventional pay television that requires monthly subscription.

RCTI was initially co-owned by PT Rajawali Wira Bhakti Utama (later Rajawali Corpora) and PT Bimantara Citra (later Global Mediacom, now known as PT Media Nusantara Citra (MNC)), thus its name. One of its commissioner at that time Indra Rukmana is the husband of Tutut Soeharto, the founder and ex-owner of its eventual sister network TPI. It is completely owned by MNC, which also owns GTV, MNCTV, and iNews, both private Indonesian television networks.

RCTI now has 47 relay stations around Indonesia and reaches over 180 million viewers.

Programming
The flagship news program is Seputar iNews (formerly Seputar Indonesia), which has morning, lunchtime and late-night editions. RCTI also airs quiz shows, including the Indonesian version of Who Wants to Be a Millionaire, which ran from 2001 to 2006. Animated shows include the original Aikatsu! series, Doraemon and Crayon Shin-chan. Aikatsu! and Crayon Shin-Chan have since been replaced by locally produced Kiko.

RCTI has broadcast various popular soap opera titles from production houses such as Multivision Plus, Starvision Plus, Prima Entertainment (closed), Soraya Intercine Films, Tobali Putra Productions, and also currently the production houses owned by MNC Media which focuses on its own production as well as the distributor of soap operas from the production house that has been mentioned previously, namely MNC Pictures. This happened because the contract collaboration between SinemArt and MD Entertainment with MNC Group has been ended, because the shares were taken back by SCM (SinemArt) and Trans Media. RCTI currently airs several television series known as Layar Drama Indonesia (formerly Mega Sinetron), showing in many titles, and the most popular television series currently are Ikatan Cinta (The Tie of Love). Formerly, it also airs weekly television series like Bella Vista, Mutiara Cinta (Pearls of Love), Shangri-La, Tuyul dan Mbak Yul, the fantasy-comedy Bidadari Yang Terluka (Rage of Angel), and  ABG. It also airs occasional sport programmes and localized version of talent show under international licenses, such as Indonesian Idol, Rising Star Indonesia, MasterChef Indonesia, X Factor Indonesia, and Indonesia's Got Talent.

Other segments
Like other Indonesian television networks, For RCTI Nationwide feed not be shown Subuh and Maghrib from Jakarta. RCTI shows Subuh and Maghrib prayer calls (adhan) in some transmitter stations, including Jakarta and Bandung. The prayer calls are best known for using a  recording of Sheikh Ali Ahmed Mulla, a well-known muezzin of Masjid al-Haram in Saudi Arabia

Some RCTI transmitter stations also broadcast local programming. For example, RCTI Surabaya airs Seputar iNews Jatim, while in Bandung, Seputar iNews Jabar is aired. The Palembang station shows Seputar iNews Sumsel, the Batam station shows Seputar iNews Kepri and the Medan station shows Seputar iNews Sumut. They are mostly shown during the final half-hour of Seputar iNews Pagi (05:30-06:00 WIB or, depending on the local area, 06:30-07:00 WITA and 07:30-08:00 WIT)

Overseas broadcasting
RCTI is available as a free-to-air channel in East Timor, but only in Dili and other cities such as Ermera and Baucau. RCTI is also available in Malaysia as a free-to-air channel in Johor Bahru, and in Singapore as a free-to-air channel by using antenna. RCTI is the only Indonesian free-to-air TV channel to be broadcast free-to-air outside Indonesia. Indonesian drama series like Bunga di Tepi Jalan, Bintang, Liontin and Pernikahan Dini currently air on Astro Aruna, a channel on the Singaporean SingTel mio TV 24 Hours IPTV Pay TV Service, but these were broadcast on RCTI on 2001, 2005 and 2006 respectively.

Notable broadcasts 
Obama Eksklusif RCTI Bersama Putra Nababan ("Exclusive Interview with Barack Obama") is a television program that aired in March 2010, showing an interview between Indonesian journalist Putra Nababan and President Barack Obama. According to the president, it was probably the first interview ever done by Indonesian television in the White House. The interview covered the partnership between Indonesia and the United States and the president's experiences during his childhood in Indonesia.

This show won an award at the 2011 Panasonic Gobel Awards.

Presenters

Current
 Atika Suri (as editor-in-chief)
 Anggita Wulandewi Disastra (formerly at BeritaSatu)
 Ledi Marina
 Nawayogi Kusuma (formerly at Trans TV)
 Raissa Nadia
 Rizky Hasan
 Ryanka Putra
 Aiman Witjaksono (comeback after 11 years worked or formerly at Kompas TV)

Former
 Ade Novit
 Ahmad Mahadi
 Akbari Madjid
 Amalia Kartika
 Apreyvita Wulansari
 Arief Suditomo (now an editor-in-chief at MetroTV)
 Ariyo Ardi (now at GTV and MNC News)
 Asti Husadi
 Astrid Megatari
 Astrid Wibisono (now at Kompas TV)
 Bahrul Alam
 Bayu Sugarda
 Catharina Davy
 Chandra Sugarda Nazir
 Chantal Della Concetta
 Dentamira Kusuma
 Dian Mirza (now at CNBC Indonesia)
 Diana Zein
 Desvita Feronika Bionda (now at MNCTV)
 Faris Ahmad Prasetyo
 Fauziah Dasuki
 Helmi Johannes (now at VOA Indonesia)
 Ira Syarief
 Irsan Karim (now at CNN Indonesia)
 Iwan Malik (deceased)
 Iwan Harjadi
 Michael Tjandra (now at RTV)
 Meidiana Hutomo
 Desi Anwar (now at CNN Indonesia)
 Putra Nababan (now a member of DPR RI PDI Perjuangan)
 Adolf Posumah
 Joice Triatman
 Dana Iswara
 Joy Astro (now at SCTV)
 Devi Trianna
 Edwin Nazir
 Ersa Siregar (deceased)
 Yusron Syarif (deceased)
 Gustav Aulia
 Danke Drajat
 Driantama
 Fetty Fajriati
 Weka Gunawan
 Andi Iskandar
 Teguh Juwarno
 Ronny Kusuma
 Zaldi Nurzaman
 Isyana Bagoes Oka (now at Partai Solidaritas Indonesia)
 Ida Parwati
 Trishna Sanubari (deceased)
 Iqbal Faiz
 Yohannes Stephanus
 Inne Sudjono (snow at BMKG)
 Ajeng Kamaratih
 Siane Indriani (now at Komnas HAM)
 Pius Wans Mahdi
 Joni Kurniawan
 Nova Poerwadi (now at VOA Indonesia)
 Madrus Hakim
 Andhika Pratama (now at Sonora FM and Kompas TV)
 Sulthan Aqil Falah (now at Motion Radio and Kompas TV)
Nurul Izzatunnisa (now at Radio Smart FM)
Erika Herlina
Astrid Novianti
Naufal Fadhillah
Rama Wirandani (now at CNN Indonesia)
 Mega Novelia
 Pica Wiriahardja
 Jihan Novita (now at Kompas TV)
 Diaz Kaslina
 Egiet Hapsari
 Tasya Syarief (now at RTV)
 Brigita Ferlina (retired)
 Shafinaz Nachiar (now at CNBC Indonesia)
 Zurayda Salim
 Tommy Tjokro (now at BuddyKu)
 Prabu Revolusi (currently serving as Director of News for MNC Media and Chief Editor of iNews and MNC News)

Branding

Slogans

Anniversary
Menuju Indonesia Gemilang (Towards the bright Indonesia) (1998)
Satu Indonesia Satu (One Indonesia one) (2000)
RCTImu, RCTIku (My RCTI, Your RCTI) (2001)
Untukmu Selamanya (Forever for yours) (2002)
Bersama Wujudkan Impian (Together make dreams happen) (2003)
Semakin Oke (More Okays) (2004)
Selalu di Hati, Selalu di Nanti (Always in heart, always wanted) (2005)
Gemerlap Keajaiban (Sparkling Miracles) (2007)
Wujudkan Mimpi Indonesia (Make Indonesian dreams happen) (2009)
Terima Kasih Indonesia (Thanks to Indonesians) (2018)
Warna Cerita Cinta (Colors of love stories) (2019)

See also
 List of television stations in Indonesia
 Television in Indonesia
 MNCTV
 GTV
 iNews
 Koran Sindo
 Media Nusantara Citra

References

External links
Official website

 
Television networks in Indonesia
Mass media in Jakarta
Television channels and stations established in 1989
1989 establishments in Indonesia
Media Nusantara Citra